Blackstone is a 1972 historical thriller novel by the British writer Derek Lambert, published under the pen name Richard Falkirk. It is the first in a series of novels featuring Edmund Blackstone, a member of the Bow Street Runners in the 1820s. Blackstone is assigned the job of protecting the young Princess Victoria, a task he initially considers a waste of time but which soon proves to be dangerous.

References

Bibliography
 Burton, Alan. Historical Dictionary of British Spy Fiction. Rowman & Littlefield, 2016.

1972 British novels
Novels by Derek Lambert 
British historical novels
British thriller novels
Novels set in London
Novels set in the 1820s
Methuen Publishing books